Silvestre Selva Sacasa  (31 December 1777 – 1855) was a Nicaraguan politician of Basque origin, who, as a senator in the State Legislative Assembly, was appointed by the invading forces of Francisco Malespín to serve as provisional Supreme Director, which he served from 16 December 1844 to 20 January 1845 with headquarters in the city of Masaya.

Biography

Background 
Born on 31 December 1777 in Granada, he was the illegitimate son of Lieutenant General José Roberto Sacasa Marenco and Ubalda Rosalía Selva del Castillo Mayor.

He was a maternal relative of Roberto Sacasa, 10th President of Nicaragua.

Malespín's War 
On 25 October 1844 the so-called Guerra de Malespín began when León was besieged by troops from El Salvador and Honduras under the command of General Francisco Malespín, a Salvadoran military ruler and a conservative convinced that he obtained the support of the Granadan legitimists.

José Francisco del Montenegro and Juan Ruiz were the ambassadors sent by Granada and Rivas to Malespín, with the result of the creation of a provisional government in charge of Senator Selva based in Masaya and without the consent of León, seat of the government of Emiliano Madriz who as Supreme Director directed the defenses of the city, which was finally occupied with the subsequent looting of its churches.

Overthrow of Malespín 
On 2 February 1845 Joaquín Eufrasio Guzmán, the Vice President of El Salvador, with support from much of San Salvador, declared himself President of El Salvador. Malespín, backed by Honduran forces, returned to El Salvador in an attempt to regain his presidency, thus ending the war in Nicaragua. Selva was able to escape from León, where he was stationed after Blas Antonio Sáenz and José León Sandoval formed a counter-government in Masaya, which on 20 January declared Sáenz as provisional Supreme Director, until Sandoval was elected on 4 April.

References 

Presidents of Nicaragua
1777 births
1855 deaths